Rooks Creek Township is located in Livingston County, Illinois. As of the 2010 census, its population was 567 and it contained 233 housing units.

Geography

Demographics

History
Rooks Creek Township and Rooks Creek were named after Roderick Rook.  He was the first settler in the area that would eventually become Rooks Creek Township.  He arrived from Pennsylvania with his family some time between late 1830 and the Spring of 1831.

References

External links
US Census
City-data.com
Illinois State Archives

Townships in Livingston County, Illinois
Populated places established in 1857
1857 establishments in Illinois
Townships in Illinois